Gloria Cabral (born 1982) is a Brazilian-Paraguayan architect, a titular partner of the firm Gabinete Arquitectura.

Early years
Gloria Cabral was born in São Paulo, Brazil in 1982. At age six she moved with her family to Asuncion, Paraguay. She studied architecture at the Universidad Nacional de Asunción. Before finishing university, in 2003, she joined Gabinete de Arquitectura. At that time, one of the partners retired and Cabral, along with other interns, formed a group that became a partner of the studio. Cabral and founding member Solano Benítez also became romantic partners.

Career
Gloria Cabral has been a member of Gabinde de Arquitectura since 2004. She currently directs it, along with Solano Benitez and his son, Solanito.

In 2014, Cabral was chosen by the Swiss architect Peter Zumthor as his disciple as part of the 2014-2015 Rolex Mentor and Protégé Arts Initiative. Her selection arose through a search made by the Swiss firm among young talents around the world. She was one of four finalists in the architecture category, and the only woman selected. That year, she traveled to Switzerland several times and worked with Zumthor on designing a tea house in South Korea.

Awards and recognitions

In 2016, together with her partners, she won the Golden Lion of the Venice Biennale of Architecture, for Best Participation in the International Exhibition.

In 2018, she received the Moira Gemmill Prize for Emerging Architecture, one of the  granted by the Architectural Review and the Architects' Journal.

References

External links
  

1982 births
Brazilian architects
Brazilian women architects
Brazilian expatriates in Paraguay
Living people
Paraguayan architects
People from São Paulo
Universidad Nacional de Asunción alumni
Women architects